Rosalina Mazari Espín (born 7 November 1971) is a Mexican politician affiliated with the Institutional Revolutionary Party. As of 2014 she served as Deputy of the LIX Legislature of the Mexican Congress representing Morelos.

References

1971 births
Living people
People from Cuernavaca
Women members of the Chamber of Deputies (Mexico)
Institutional Revolutionary Party politicians
21st-century Mexican politicians
21st-century Mexican women politicians
Universidad Autónoma del Estado de Morelos alumni
Politicians from Morelos
Deputies of the LIX Legislature of Mexico
Members of the Chamber of Deputies (Mexico) for Morelos